Songs of the American Spirit is the last studio album by the progressive bluegrass band Country Gentlemen. The album was released August 24, 2004, just six days after the death of Charlie Waller.

Track listing
 Fighting Side of Me  (Haggard) 03:11
 Be Quiet When Willie Walks By (O'Reilly ) 03
 Between Fire and Water  (Care, Marcus, Seiler) 02:14
 Crying in the Chapel  (Glenn) 03:04
 Joe  (Hall, Hall) 02:35
 A Miner's Life (Dailey) 02:22
 Blackberry Blossom [instrumental]  (Traditional) 02:42
 There's a Star Spangled Banner Waving Somewhere (Darnell, Roberts) 03:06
 My Heart Is On the Mend (Hylton) 02:36
 River of Tears (Dawson) 02:32
 Stay in the Wagon Yard (Jones) 01:26
 The Vision (Waller) 02:53
 Let Me Fly Low (Hall) 02:48

Personnel
 Charlie Waller - guitar, vocals
 Dan Aldridge - mandolin, guitar, vocals
 Greg Corbett - banjo, vocals
 Ronnie Davis - bass, vocals

with
 Gene Libbea -bass
 Greg Luck - violin, bass, guitar
 Rickie Simpkins - mandolin
 Kenny Smith - guitar
 Jaret Carter - Dobro
 Sammy Shelor - banjo, guitar
 Clay Jones - guitar

References

External links
https://web.archive.org/web/20091215090142/http://www.lpdiscography.com/c/Cgentlemen/cgent.htm

2004 albums
The Country Gentlemen albums